Conservative Party is a new localist political party in Hong Kong established in 2015 by Alice Lai Yee-man. It advocates for the return of Hong Kong to become a British Overseas Territory. In the 2016 Hong Kong Legislative Council election, Lai's candidacy for the Hong Kong Island constituency was disqualified by the Electoral Affairs Commission (EAC) with five other localists on the basis that EAC claimed they do not genuinely uphold the Hong Kong Basic Law which stipulates that Hong Kong being an inalienable part of China.

See also
 Alliance of Resuming British Sovereignty over Hong Kong and Independence
 British Hong Kong
 Hong Kong Independence Party
 Localism in Hong Kong

References

Political parties established in 2015
2015 establishments in Hong Kong
Localist parties in Hong Kong
Political organisations based in Hong Kong
Conservative_parties_in_Hong_Kong